Markus Nüssli (born 9 July 1971) is a Swiss bobsledder who competed in the 1990s. At the 1998 Winter Olympics in Nagano, he won a silver medal in the four-man event with teammates Marcel Rohner, Markus Wasser and Beat Seitz.

Nüssli also won a silver medal in the four-man event at the 1999 FIBT World Championships in Cortina d'Ampezzo.

References
Bobsleigh four-man Olympic medalists for 1924, 1932-56, and since 1964
Bobsleigh four-man world championship medalists since 1930
DatabaseOlympics.com profile

1971 births
Living people
Swiss male bobsledders
Bobsledders at the 1998 Winter Olympics
Olympic silver medalists for Switzerland
Olympic bobsledders of Switzerland
Olympic medalists in bobsleigh
Medalists at the 1998 Winter Olympics
20th-century Swiss people